Parancistrocerus histrio is a species of stinging wasp in the family Vespidae.

References

Further reading

External links

 

Potter wasps
Insects described in 1841